Jörg Pose (born 18 May 1959) is a German actor. He starred in the 1988 film Bear Ye One Another's Burden and with co-star Manfred Möck, won the Silver Bear for Best Actor at the 38th Berlin International Film Festival.

Selected filmography
 Bear Ye One Another's Burden (1988)
 I Am Guilty (2005)

References

External links

1959 births
Living people
People from Rostock
People from Bezirk Rostock
German male film actors
East German actors
German male television actors
20th-century German male actors
21st-century German male actors
Silver Bear for Best Actor winners